Thomas Sletteland was born in Bergen, Norway, on the 18th of February, 1872, and enlisted in the United States Army. Not much is known about his emigration to the US or when he enlisted but we do know that his actions in Luzon during the Philippine–American War, with Company C of the 1st North Dakota Infantry, earned him the Medal of Honor.

Medal of Honor citation
Rank and organization: Private, Company C, 1st North Dakota Infantry
Place and date: Near Paete, Luzon, Philippine Islands, April 12, 1899
Entered service at: Grafton, N. Dak. Birth: Norway
Date of issue: March 11, 1902

Citation:

Single-handed and alone defended his dead and wounded comrades against a greatly superior force of the enemy.

Post War
Thomas received his Medal of Honor on the 11th of March, 1902, and he died thirteen years later on the 1st of September, 1915 at the age of 43. He is buried in the North Dakota Veterans Cemetery in Mandan, North Dakota: Section C, Site 438.

See also
List of Medal of Honor recipients
List of Philippine–American War Medal of Honor recipients

References

1874 births
1915 deaths
United States Army Medal of Honor recipients
United States Army soldiers
People from Mandan, North Dakota
American military personnel of the Philippine–American War
Norwegian-born Medal of Honor recipients
Norwegian emigrants to the United States
Philippine–American War recipients of the Medal of Honor